Joseph Canavan (4 November 1880 – 10 January 1924) was an Australian rules footballer who played with South Melbourne and Melbourne in the Victorian Football League (VFL).

He drowned in Rufus Creek near Wentworth, New South Wales in 1924.

Notes

References
 South Melbourne Team, Melbourne Punch, (Thursday, 4 June 1903), p.16.

External links 

1880 births
Australian rules footballers from Victoria (Australia)
Sydney Swans players
Melbourne Football Club players
South Bendigo Football Club players
1924 deaths
Accidental deaths in New South Wales